Vincent Tong (born May 2, 1980) is a Canadian voice actor and voice director. His voice roles include Gene Khan / The Mandarin in Iron Man: Armored Adventures, Toro in Sushi Pack, Henry in Kid vs. Kat, Garble, Flash Sentry, and Sandbar in My Little Pony: Friendship is Magic, Daniel in Voltron Force, Kai in Ninjago as well as Jestro in Nexo Knights. He also voiced Euden in Dragalia Lost before being replaced by Victor Hunter.

Filmography

Anime
 Beyblade Burst – Ukyo Ibuki
 Death Note – Touta Matsuda, Field Reporter
 Gin Tama – Sogo Okita
 Hello Carbot – Blaster
 Nana – Kinoshita
 Slam Dunk – Tetsushi Shiozaki
 The Story of Saiunkoku – Yushun Tei (Jun Yu), Guard #2

Animation
 16 Hudson - Sam, Mr. Wu, MC
 Bob the Builder (2015 TV series) – Muck (US), Brandon (US)
 Chip and Potato – Mr. Badger-Fox, Mr. Buffalo, Pa Fant, Roy Razzle, Ray Razzle
 Chuck's Choice – Joey Adonis, School Cameraman
 Corner Gas Animated – Audio Book Voice, Clown, Impersonator #2, Jason Steele, Kyle, Male Hipster, New Vacuum, Ravi, Won Hu
 The Deep – Antaeus (Ant) Nekton, Pirate Crewman #2, WOA Officer, Guard #1 (1), Fisherman #1, Guard #2 (2), Frank, Salvage Captain (2), Glaucus
 Dinotrux – Chunk, Navs, Washout, Ankylodump #1, Craneosaur #1, Craneosaur, Jaffa
 Dragons: The Nine Realms - Eugene Wong
 Exchange Student Zero – John, Nephlan 1, Sensei
 Gigantosaurus – Trey
 Hero: 108 – Yan Ching
 Iron Man: Armored Adventures – Gene Khan / The Mandarin
 Johnny Test (2021 TV series) - Jorf Muskerberg, Cheesy Singer
 Kid vs. Kat – Henry
 Kong: King of the Apes – Danny Quon, Chatter, Young Guy, Egypitian Officer
 Lego Elves – Tidus Stormsurfer
 Lego Jurassic World: Legend of Isla Nublar – Dr. Henry Wu, Security Team Member #1, Mr. DNA, Security Team, Park Employee, Happy Man, Dino Trainer, Hotel Manager, Kid #3, Repair Crew Member, Markus, Park Worker (2)
 Lego Jurassic World: The Secret Exhibit – Dr. Henry Wu, Boy, Captain, ACU Team Member
 Ninjago – Kai, Good Detective, Doubloon, Lizaru, Chokun, Ray, Jerk, Constrictai Soldier (2), Muffled Judge, Littlest Boy, Subway Controller #1, Venomari Soldier, Serpentine Soldier, Serpentine Soldier (2), Bizarro Kai, Cop, Startooth, Mini Scout, Warrior Scout #2, Tommy, Nindroid, Rescue Member #2, Computer, Computer Voice, Thug, Restaurant Owner, Guard #1 (2), Security #2, Rex Airship, Angry Ghost, Broken Arm Kid, Angry Pedestrian, Scavenger, White Mask, Biker #1 (1), Biker, Cop (1), SOG Soldier, SOG Rider
 Lego Nexo Knights – Jestro, Jousting Bieber
 Littlest Pet Shop: A World of Our Own – Mister Yut, Austin Goldenpup, Scoot Raccoonerson, Hoffman Beary, Shark Salesman, Foreman Macaw, Ferret Carnival Worker, Ride Operator, Ranger Greatpup, Walrus, Parrot, Sanders Pupson, Frog Monster
 Llama Llama – Officer Flamingo, Daddy Gnu
 LoliRock – Mephisto
 Mack & Moxy – Blump, Little Bird
 Max Steel (2013 TV series) – Vendor, Commander Parker voice
 Mega Man: Fully Charged – Aki Light / Mega Man, Namagem
 My Little Pony: Friendship is Magic – Prince Blueblood, Pony Joe, Garble, Doughnut Joe, Flash Sentry, Dignitary, Duke of Maretonia, Yellow Changeling, Gray Throne Guard 2, Feather Bangs, Villager, Rumble (S7E21), Sandbar, Skeptical Somnambula Villager, Illusionary Changeling #2
 Nerds and Monsters – Irwin Chang-Stein, Young Monster 1, Man-Eating Pepper Plant, Fighting Monster 1
 Pac-Man and the Ghostly Adventures – Master Goo
 Packages from Planet X – Dan Zembrowsky
 Polly Pocket – Nicholas, Mayor Kisser, Neil, Eduardo
 Slugterra – Bartholomew, Quentin's Cell Guard
 StarBeam - Cosmic Crusher, Snowfoot
 Storm Hawks – Raptor Guard
 Superbook – Aaron (2)
 Super Dinosaur – KAL / Erupticus
 Super Monsters – Drac, Mr. Gabmore, Mandarin Teacher, Henri in Boots, Luigi, Werewolf Kid, Party Guest #3
 Sushi Pack – Toro
 Voltron Force – Daniel, Pedicab Robot, Comms Officer
 The Epic Tales of Captain Underpants – Additional Voices (Uncredited)
 The Dragon Prince – Prince Kasef
 The Last Kids on Earth - Schnozz
 Tom and Jerry Tales - Alien Mouse #1, Bearded Man
 Mighty Mighty Monsters – Frankie
 Sonic Prime - various characters

Film
 Bob the Builder: Mega Machines – Muck (US)
 Barbie: A Fashion Fairytale – Hotdogeteria Guy
 Barbie: Princess Charm School – Prince Nicholas, Guard #2
 Ghost Patrol - Marco Flores, Texan
 L.O.R.D: Legend of Ravaging Dynasties – Silver
 My Little Pony: Equestria Girls – Flash Sentry
 My Little Pony: Equestria Girls – Friendship Games – Flash Sentry, Bus Driver
 My Little Pony: Equestria Girls – Legend of Everfree – Flash Sentry, Sandalwood
 My Little Pony: Equestria Girls – Rainbow Rocks – Flash Sentry, Brawly Beats (uncredited)
 Ratchet & Clank – Brax Lectrus, Solana Trooper
 Sausage Party – Pislitz Chips, Juicebox, Jamaican Rum
 Slugterra: Return of the Elementals – Junjie
 Super Monsters Furever Friends – Drac, Luigi, Mr. Gabmore
 They Wait – Young Xiang
 The Willoughbys – Barnaby Twins
 The Ice Age Adventures of Buck Wild - Crash

Video games
 Dragalia Lost – Euden
 Nickelodeon Kart Racers 3: Slime Speedway - Zuko
 Prototype 2 – Additional Voices
 Puzzle Fighter – Ryu, Ken Masters
 Rogue Company – Diego "Chaac" Hernandez

Live action English dubbing
 Death Note – Touta Matsuda
 Death Note 2: The Last Name – Touta Matsuda

Voice director
 Shank 2

References

External links
 
 

1980 births
Living people
Canadian male video game actors
Canadian male voice actors
Canadian people of Hong Kong descent
Canadian television directors
Canadian voice directors
Male actors from Vancouver
21st-century Canadian male actors